Herman Ehrlich (18361895) was a Croatian architect and businessman.

Ehrlich was born in Našice, Croatia on 9 August 1836 to a Jewish family. He was married to Marija (née Eisner) Ehrlich with whom he had five children; Adolf, Ernest, Đuro, Hugo and Mira. From 1863 to 1874 Ehrlich conducted his business in Našice. In 1874 he moved with his family to Zagreb, Croatia. Ehrlich built roads across Slavonia and Croatia. He also built many military facilities, public and private buildings. Due to high quality construction his company was one of the best known in the Kingdom of Croatia-Slavonia and Kingdom of Dalmatia. Ehrlich's company also worked on the regulation of the river Vuka and built the sewage network in Osijek. Ehrlich died on 23 October 1895 in Zagreb and was buried at the Mirogoj Cemetery.

References

Bibliography

 

1836 births
1895 deaths
People from Našice
Burials at Mirogoj Cemetery
Croatian Jews
Austro-Hungarian Jews
Croatian Austro-Hungarians
Jewish architects
Croatian businesspeople
19th-century Croatian architects